Kotcho Lake Village Provincial Park is a provincial park in north-eastern British Columbia, Canada.

The park showcases traditional dwellings of the Fort Nelson First Nation of the Dene Tha.

See also
List of British Columbia Provincial Parks

References

Northern Rockies Regional Municipality
Provincial parks of British Columbia
1997 establishments in British Columbia
Protected areas established in 1997